Witnesses Wanted (German: Zeugen gesucht) is a 1930 German silent mystery film directed by Edmund Heuberger and starring Eddie Polo, Lotte Stein and Kurt Brenkendorf.

The film's sets were designed by the art directors Gustav A. Knauer and Willy Schiller. It was released by the German branch of Universal Pictures.

Cast
 Eddie Polo as Eddie Polo  
 Hedy Waldow  as Lotte  
 Kurt Brenkendorf as Sandersen - Juwelier  
 Leopold von Ledebur as Kommissar  
 Lotte Stein as Besitzerin einer Plätterei  
 Marion Gerth as Käthe  
 Max Maximilian as Paul Görner  
 Rudolf Lettinger as Fred Hiller  
 Willy Clever as Hans Oldenroth

References

Bibliography
 Erika Wottrich. Deutsche Universal.: Transatlantische Verleih- und Produktionsstrategien eines Hollywood-Studios in den 20er und 30er Jahren. 2001.

External links

1930 films
Films of the Weimar Republic
German silent feature films
Films directed by Edmund Heuberger
German mystery films
1930 mystery films
German black-and-white films
Silent mystery films
1930s German films
1930s German-language films